is a Japanese actress and model. She is best known for her role as Hina Izumi in the Tokusatsu series Kamen Rider OOO.

Filmography

TV series

Films

Dubbing
Brain Games, Cara Santa Maria

References

External links
 Official profile at Sony Music Artists 
 

21st-century Japanese actresses
Japanese female models
Japanese television personalities
1994 births
Living people
People from Kurume